The following is a list of George Foster Peabody Award winners and honorable mentions during the decade of the 2000s.

2000

2001

2002

2003

2004

2005

2006

2007

2008

2009

References

See also
The Pulitzer Prizes
Academy Award for Best Documentary Feature
Primetime Emmy Awards

 List2000